The Api-Nampa Conservation Area is a protected area in the Far-Western Development Region, Nepal. It was established in 2010 and covers  encompassing 21 Village Development Committees in the Darchula District. The western boundary is formed by the Mahakali River, and the northern by the international border with Tibet. Adjacent to the east are the Bajhang and Baitadi districts.

Named after the two peaks Api and Nampa, it was established to conserve the unique biodiversity and cultural heritage of the area. It is inhabited by 54,358 people living in 8966 households.

A grasslands plateau is at the center of the area. It is intermixed with various forest types.

Fauna
Mammalian species include snow leopard, Himalayan black bear, red panda, common langur, Himalayan tahr, Himalayan musk deer, goral and serow. Birds include Himalayan monal, snowcock and blood pheasant.

References

External links 
 Government of Nepal: Api-Nampa Conservation Area
 Department of National Parks and Wildlife Conservation, Nepal: Api-Nampa Conservation Area

Protected areas of Nepal
2010 establishments in Nepal
Wildlife conservation in Nepal